Zarshuyon (formerly Sangvor) is a jamoat in Tajikistan. It is located in Sangvor District, one of the Districts of Republican Subordination. The jamoat has a total population of 4,785 (2015).

Notes

References

Populated places in Districts of Republican Subordination
Jamoats of Tajikistan